The Paku Divinity School is a Baptist theological institute in Taungoo, Bago Division, Myanmar. It is affiliated with the Paku Karen Baptist Association. The campus can be accessed from Myo Gyi and Boundary roads. The theology program is approved by Association for Theological Education in Myanmar (ATEM).

History
The Paku Divinity School, originally known as Paku Bible School, was founded in 1977 by the Paku Karen Baptist Association. The Paku Divinity School is a Christian Bible school which produces approximately 80 Christian leaders every year and is affiliated to the Karen Baptist Theological Seminary. The PDS was mainly focused on Theological Studies. In 2008, PDS launched Basic Computer program.

Principals
 Rev John Letta.
 Rev Dr Augustus Spurgeon.
 Daw Aye Aye Myaing .
 Amady Htoo (current)

References

Educational institutions established in 1977
Universities and colleges in Taungoo
Baptist seminaries and theological colleges in Myanmar
Christian colleges in Myanmar
1977 establishments in Burma